Pomiany may refer to the following places:

Pomiany, Aleksandrów County in Kuyavian-Pomeranian Voivodeship (north-central Poland)
Pomiany, Mogilno County in Kuyavian-Pomeranian Voivodeship (north-central Poland)
Pomiany, Podlaskie Voivodeship (north-east Poland)
Pomiany, Greater Poland Voivodeship (west-central Poland)